Rowing at the 1972 Summer Olympics featured 7 events, all for men. It was the last time that rowing did not include women's disciplines at the Olympics.

Participating nations
A total of 440 rowers from 35 nations competed at the Munich:

  (18)
  (16)
  (16)
  (5)
  (1)
  (2)
  (8)
  (16)
  (1)
  (7)
  (21)
  (12)
  (26)
  (3)
  (18)
  (17)
  (15)
  (1)
  (21)
  (3)
  (9)
  (21)
  (19)
  (6)
  (16) 
  (16)
  (3)
  (9)
  (26)
  (1)
  (17)
  (26)
  (3)
  (26)
  (15)

Medal table

Medal summary

Men's events

References

External links
 International Olympic Committee medal database

 
1972 Summer Olympics events
1972